Charles-Amédée-Philippe van Loo (25 August 1719 – 15 November 1795) was a French painter of allegorical scenes and portraits.

He studied under his father, the painter Jean-Baptiste van Loo, at Turin and Rome, where in 1738 he won the Prix de Rome, then at Aix-en-Provence, before returning to Paris in 1745. He was invited to join the Académie Royale de Peinture et de Sculpture in 1747, and that year he married his cousin Marie-Marguerite Lebrun, daughter of the painter Michel Lebrun (died 1753).

He was the author of the only known real-life portrait of the Marquis de Sade.

Among his brothers were the painters François van Loo (1708–1732) and Louis-Michel van Loo (1707–1771).

External links 
 More on his works

1719 births
1795 deaths
18th-century French painters
French male painters
French portrait painters
Prix de Rome for painting
Rococo painters
18th-century French male artists